Ma Yunwen (born 19 October 1986 in Shanghai) is a Chinese volleyball player.

She was part of the gold medal winning team at the 2005 Asian Championship.  She was also part of the Chinese team that won the bronze medal at the 2008 Summer Olympics in Beijing.
She won a gold medal at the 2011 Montreux Volley Masters.

Clubs
  Shanghai (2002-2013)
  Igtisadchi Baku (2013-2014)
  Shanghai (2014–2019)

References

Profile

See also
China at the 2012 Summer Olympics#Volleyball
Volleyball at the 2012 Summer Olympics – Women's tournament

1986 births
Living people
Olympic bronze medalists for China
Olympic volleyball players of China
Volleyball players from Shanghai
Volleyball players at the 2008 Summer Olympics
Volleyball players at the 2012 Summer Olympics
Olympic medalists in volleyball
Medalists at the 2008 Summer Olympics
Asian Games medalists in volleyball
Volleyball players at the 2010 Asian Games
Igtisadchi Baku volleyball players
Chinese women's volleyball players
Asian Games gold medalists for China
Medalists at the 2010 Asian Games
Middle blockers
Chinese expatriate sportspeople in Azerbaijan
Expatriate volleyball players in Azerbaijan
21st-century Chinese women